John Gatins (born April 16, 1968) is an American screenwriter, director, and actor. For writing the drama film Flight (2012), he was nominated for the Academy Award for Best Original Screenplay.

Gatins made his directorial feature debut by filming his screenplay for Dreamer (2005), and also wrote or co-wrote Coach Carter (2005), Real Steel (2011), Kong: Skull Island and Power Rangers (2017). As an actor, he has collaborated three times with Eddie Murphy, on Norbit (2007), Meet Dave (2008) and A Thousand Words (2012).

Early life and education
Gatins was born in Manhattan, New York, where his father worked as a New York City police officer. Later, his family relocated to the Poughkeepsie area, where Gatins went on to attend Arlington High School and Vassar College. He graduated in 1990 with a degree in drama.

Career
After graduation, Gatins moved to Los Angeles with the intention of pursuing acting. His first role was in the low budget 1993 horror film Witchboard 2: The Devil's Doorway, followed by a role in the 1994 movie Pumpkinhead II: Blood Wings. As he won small roles in larger-budget productions, including 1999's Varsity Blues and 2002's Big Fat Liar, Jeremy Kramer, a fellow Vassar grad and employee at Fox, paid him $1,000 to write a teen comedy by the name of Smells Like Teen Suicide. Varsity Blues was directed by Brian Robbins and produced by Michael Tollin, the latter of whom would, in 2001, direct Gatins's first screenplay, a romantic comedy entitled Summer Catch, while Robbins produced it. Tollin returned in 2002 to direct Gatins's second screenplay, a dramedy called Hardball. While continuing to act, Gatins wrote Coach Carter which was released in 2005. The same year, he presented his first directorial effort, Dreamer, which he also wrote.

At the suggestion of Steven Spielberg, Gatins was brought in to work on Real Steel, a science fiction film based on a 1956 Richard Matheson short story. Gatins considered the draft of the screenplay which he received when he began working on the project to be very dark, and he adapted it to focus more on the family aspects, such as the film's father-son relationship, about which he was accustomed to writing in his previous works. Real Steel was released October 7, 2011.

Since 1999, Gatins had been working on Flight, an original screenplay which, by 2009, was 149 pages. Robert Zemeckis picked up the script; and the resulting film, starring Denzel Washington, was released to critical acclaim in 2012. Gatins received a nomination for the Academy Award for Best Writing (Original Screenplay) at the 85th Academy Awards for his screenplay.

DreamWorks tapped Gatins to write a sequel to Real Steel before the film was released based on positive test screenings of the movie. He and his brother, George Gatins, also adapted the Electronic Arts videogame series Need for Speed into an eponymous film.

Gatins rewrote Kong: Skull Island (2017) for Legendary Pictures and Warner Bros. Pictures. He also rewrote the 2017 Power Rangers reboot film, incorporating aspects from previous drafts by Max Landis, Matt Sazama, Burk Sharpless, Michele Mulroney, and Kieran Mulroney.

In 2022, Gatins and Andrea Berloff have signed a creative partnership with Netflix.

Filmography

Acting roles

Thanks
 Ciggies (2006) (Short film)
 Eagle vs Shark (2007)
 Harmony and Me (2007)
 Martha Marcy May Marlene (2011)
 The House of Tomorrow (2017)

References

External links
 

1960s births
Living people
American male screenwriters
American male film actors
Male actors from New York City
Vassar College alumni
Writers from Manhattan
Writers from Poughkeepsie, New York
20th-century American male actors
21st-century American male actors
American male television actors
Screenwriters from New York (state)